Ahmad Jamal '73 is an album by American jazz pianist Ahmad Jamal featuring performances recorded in 1973 and released on the 20th Century label.

Critical reception
The Allmusic review awarded the album 2 stars, stating: "Ahmad Jamal '73 is an early instance of him playing an instrument besides acoustic piano, but it is a few tracks away from being a necessity."

Track listing
 "The World Is a Ghetto" (Papa Dee Allen, Harold Ray Brown, B.B. Dickerson, Lonnie Jordan, Charles Miller, Lee Oskar, Howard E. Scott) – 9:44
 "Children of the Night" (Thom Bell, Linda Creed) – 5:04
 "Superstition" (Stevie Wonder) – 4:03
 "Trilby" (Orlando Murden) – 4:34
 "Sustah, Sustah" (Ra Twani Za Yemeni) – 6:44
 "Soul Girl" (Joel Beal) – 3:25
 "Peace at Last" (Charles Colbert) – 6:17

Personnel
Ahmad Jamal – electric piano
Orchestra arranged and conducted by Richard Evans

References 

20th Century Fox Records albums
Ahmad Jamal albums
1973 albums